Asenav (Astilleros y Servicios Navales) is a Chilean ship building company, based in Santiago with its main shipyards located in southern Chile in the middle of the city of Valdivia, some  from the Bay of Corral at the Pacific coast. The company was established in 1974 by the German immigrant Eberhard Kossmann.

Ships
Ships built by Asenav:
Ferries
Fueguino (1999)
 Alonso de Ercilla (2001)
Patagonia (2006)
Cruz del Sur II (2006)
Crux Australis (2008)
Don Jaime (2012)
MV Pelee Islander II 
Tug boats
Pulli (1991)
Pirehuico (1996)
Chan Chan (2000)
Riñihue (2002)
Svitzer Bedford (2005)
Skyring (2007)
Loncura (2008)
Punta Pereira (2012)
Tourism ships
Patagonia Express (1991)
Luciano Beta (1994)
Mystique Princess (1996)
Mare Australis (2002)
Atmosphere (2006)
Stella Australis (2010)
Ventus Autralis (2017)
Magellan Explorer (2019)
Fishing vessels
Tritón (1993)
Pehuenco (1994)
Corsario I (1997)
Christian í Grótinum (1997)
El Cazador (1997)
Murman II (1998)
Offshore ships
Skandi Stord (1998)
Maersk Dispatcher (2005)
Maersk Nomad (2009)
Maersk Nexus (2010)
Well boats
Don Antonio C (2003)
Patagón IV (2003)
Patagón V (2004)
Patagón VI (2007)
Patagón VII (2012)
Patagon IX (2020)

References

External links

Asenav.cl - Official homepage

Shipyards of Chile
Manufacturing companies based in Santiago
Manufacturing companies established in 1974
1974 establishments in Chile
Chilean companies established in 1974